Fujinoshin Tsukasa (born 6 November 1960 as Tetsuya Yagi) is a former sumo wrestler from Funabashi, Chiba, Japan. He made his professional debut in March 1976, and reached the top division in September 1986. His highest rank was maegashira 1. He retired in September 1990 after injury problems and became an elder in the Japan Sumo Association.

Career
He was born in Funabashi, Chiba, not far from the Kuramae Kokugikan. At the age of 15 in March 1976 he joined Izutsu stable (later renamed Kokonoe stable), recruited by former yokozuna Kitanofuji. He switched from his family name of Yagi to the ring name of Fujihikari in 1978. After several years in the lower divisions he broke into jūryō division in January 1985, but only stayed there for two tournaments. He returned to jūryō in January 1986 and made the top makuuchi division in September of that year, before falling back to jūryō. In November 1987 he returned to the top division and stayed there for two years, reaching a highest rank of maegashira 1 in January 1988, although he was unable to defeat a yokozuna or win a special prize. During this period he was part of a stable that included two yokozuna, Chiyonofuji and Hokutoumi, as well as fellow maegashira Takanofuji.

The beginning of the end of Fujinoshin′s career came on Day 12 of the Aki basho in September 1989 when he had his ankle broken by a wrestler (Misugisato) who fell on it while Fujinoshin was sitting by the dohyō waiting for his match. He was unable to compete and had to default and withdraw from the tournament. The kosho or public injury system which protected a wrestler′s rank for one tournament did not apply in his case as the injury did not occur in a tournament bout itself, and as a result he fell back to the jūryō division. He returned to sumo in January 1990 but was unable to win promotion back to makuuchi and announced his retirement in September 1990 having fallen into the makushita division after another enforced absence.

Retirement from sumo
Fujinoshin has remained in the sumo world as a toshiyori or elder of the Japan Sumo Association and has worked as a coach at Kokonoe stable and Hakkaku stable. Until 1998 he was known as Nishikido Oyakata, but when his old boss Kitanofuji quit the Sumo Association that year he switched to the Jinmaku elder name.

Fighting style
Fujinoshin employed a wide variety of techniques but was regarded by some commentators as a jack of all trades, master of none. He favoured a right hand outside, left hand inside grip (hidari-yotsu) on his opponent's mawashi or belt. His most common winning technique was yori-kiri (force out) but he also tried oshi–dashi (push out), hataki–komi (slap down), yori–taoshi (force out and down), uwate–nage (overarm throw), shitate–nage (underarm throw), uwatedashi–nage (pulling overarm throw) and katasukashi (armlock throw).

Career record

See also
Glossary of sumo terms
List of past sumo wrestlers
List of sumo elders

References

1960 births
Living people
Japanese sumo wrestlers
Sumo people from Chiba Prefecture
Kokonoe stable sumo wrestlers